Homesick (German: Heimweh) is a 1927 German silent drama film directed by Gennaro Righelli and starring Mady Christians, William Dieterle, and Ida Wüst. It was shot at the Terra Studios in Berlin. The film's art direction was by Hans Jacoby. It is set among a group of Russian émigrés living in Paris.

Cast
 Mady Christians as Fürstin Lydia Trubezkoj 
 William Dieterle as Iwan Bogdanow, Verwalter 
 Ida Wüst as Madame Kamenskaja 
 Lydia Potechina as Madame Lorrain 
 Simone Vaudry as Jeanette, ihre Tochter 
 Auguste Prasch-Grevenberg as Alte russische Baronin 
 Jean Murat   
 Alexander Murski   
 Livio Pavanelli

References

Bibliography
 Bergfelder, Tim & Bock, Hans-Michael. The Concise Cinegraph: Encyclopedia of German. Berghahn Books, 2009.
 Gibson, Hamilton Bertie. Hans Eysenck: the man and his work''. Owen, 1981.

External links

1927 films
Films of the Weimar Republic
German silent feature films
German drama films
Films directed by Gennaro Righelli
Terra Film films
1927 drama films
German black-and-white films
Films set in Paris
Silent drama films
Films shot at Terra Studios
1920s German films
1920s German-language films